Shin Do-hyun (Korean: 신도현; born November 5, 1995) is a South Korean actress and model. She is best known for her roles in television series such as First Kiss (2018), Just Dance (2018), The Banker (2019), Love with Flaws (2019–2020), Hospital Playlist (2020), and ''Doom at Your Service (2021).

Early life
Shin was born in Yeongju, South Korea on November 5, 1995. She graduated from Sungshin Women's University.

Filmography

Television series

Web series

Theater

Awards and nominations

References

External links 

 Shin Do-hyun at Vast Entertainment 
 
 
 

1995 births
Living people
People from Yeongju
21st-century South Korean actresses
South Korean female models
South Korean television actresses
South Korean film actresses
South Korean web series actresses
Sungshin Women's University alumni